The 2021 Youngstown State Penguins football team represented Youngstown State University as a member of the Missouri Valley Football Conference (MVFC) during the 2021 NCAA Division I FCS football season. Led by second-year head coach Doug Phillips, the Penguins compiled an overall record of 3–7 with a mark of 2–6 in conference play, tying for ninth place in the MVFC. Youngstown State played their home games at Stambaugh Stadium in Youngstown, Ohio.

Schedule

References

Youngstown State
Youngstown State Penguins football seasons
Youngstown State Penguins football